Paul Francis Patrick Whelan (12 December 1943 – 30 October 2019) was an Australian politician, who served as the New South Wales Minister for Police between 1995 and 2001.

Early years and background
Whelan was born and raised in Ashbury, a suburb of Sydney, Australia to Mary Bridget and John Joseph Whelan.  He was the youngest of their seven children.  He was educated at St Francis Xavier Primary School, Ashbury, De La Salle College, Ashfield, and the University of Sydney, where he received an LL.B.  He was admitted as a solicitor in 1968 and barrister in 1988.  He married Colleen Mary Healey in 1968 and had two daughters, two sons and eight grandchildren.  He was an alderman on the Ashfield Municipal Council from 1970 to 1976 and Mayor from 1971 to 1976.

Political career
Whelan represented Ashfield from  May 1976 to March 1999 and Strathfield from March 1999 to February 2003 for the Labor Party.  He was Minister for Consumer Affairs and Minister for Roads from October 1981 to February 1983 and then Minister for Water Resources and Minister for Forests until April 1984 during the Wran government.  He was also Minister for Aboriginal Affairs from February to April 1984.  He was Minister for Police from April 1995 to November 2001 during the Carr government.
Whelan retired from politics in 2003. Virginia Judge succeeded in replacing him in his seat.

References

 

|-

1943 births
2019 deaths
Members of the New South Wales Legislative Assembly
Australian Labor Party members of the Parliament of New South Wales
21st-century Australian politicians
Mayors of Ashfield